Stefan Hechenberger is an Austrian artist and programmer. His works include interactive software, computer vision projects and open-source hardware.

Hechenberger has worked with Zach Lieberman in creating the OpenCV library for openFrameworks, an open source C++ library for creative coding and graphics. (openFrameworks website). In 2006, Hechenberger co-founded the New York City and Vienna based research and development collaborative, NORTD labs, which developed the open source system called CUBIT (multi-touch) in 2007  and the more recent iteration TouchKit in 2008.
.

From 2007 to 2008, Hechenberger was an honorary fellow at Eyebeam. In 2011, under NORTD labs he was a fellow at Culture Lab UK. 
During 2012, NORTD labs held residencies at Hyperwerk Institute for Postindustrial Design in Basel, Switzerland and Carnegie Mellon University STUDIO for Creative Inquiry for their most recent project Lasersaur.

Hechenberger holds a Vordiplom in Computer Science and Astronautics from the Technical University Munich Germany and an MFA from CADRE Laboratory for New Media, San Jose State University. He also holds a Master of Professional Studies from New York University.

Selected works
 Lasersaur
 CUBIT
 Touchkit
 JTR
 Asymmetric Love #2

Awards and Fellowships 
 Artist-In-Residence MuseumqsQuartier Vienna 2013/2014
 Mozilla Open(art) Fellow 2013
 Carnegie Mellon University STUDIO for Creative Inquiry Resident 2012
 Hyperwerk Institute for Postindustrial Design Resident 2011/2012
 CultureLab Fellow 2011
 Eyebeam Art and Technology Center, Advisory Council 2008

Exhibitions and Lectures 
 Museumsquartier, Vienna, 2013
 Makerfaire Rome, 2013
 Mediamatic, Amsterdam, 2014
 Stalkfest Mediamatic, Amsterdam, 2014

References

External links
 Official website
 NORTD labs
 openFrameworks

Modern artists
Austrian contemporary artists
Austrian computer programmers
Living people
Year of birth missing (living people)